

Kingsford is a locality in South Australia located about  north of the Adelaide city centre. The Sturt Highway crosses the locality which is bounded by the Thiele Highway on the northwest, Roseworthy and Gomersal Roads on the north and the North Para River on the south.

Kingsford's boundaries were created in May 1995 for the ”long established name” which is derived from the “Kingsford homestead.”  The principal land use within the locality is agriculture.

The Kingsford homestead survives and is listed on the South Australian Heritage Register; it is also notable as a location in the Australian television series, McLeod's Daughters.  Kingsford is located within the federal Division of Barker, the state electoral district of Light and the local government area of the Light Regional Council.

References

Towns in South Australia